Bayanbulak Grassland National Nature Reserve (from Mongolian "abundant spring")  is the second largest grassland in China, located in the Bayanbulak Basin of the Tian Shan mountains in northwest China.   The terrain is mostly flat, and encompasses a middle section of the Kaidu River ("Peacock River").  The reserve is 200 km northwest of Korla in Bayingolin Mongol Autonomous Prefecture of Xinjiang Uyghur Autonomous Region.

As a high-altitude marshland (at 2,000 - 2,500 meters), the reserve is an important breeding and staging ground for birds and waterfowl, and is the highest-altitude breeding ground for swans in the world.  The area has been designated an Important Bird and Biodiversity Area (IBA #CN-114) by Birdlife International.
  At the center of the reserve is "Swan Lake", a connected series of wetlands, which was designated in 1980 as the "Bayanbulak Swan Nature Reserve" by the Xinjiang government, and upgraded in 1986 to a "National Swan Reserve" by the government of China.

Topography
The Bayanbulak Basin is an intermontane valley of the basin-and-range of the Tian Shan mountains, to the north of the Tarim Basin. The Kaidu River runs from west to east through the area, at times meandering and leaving cutoff lakes, and is fed from streams from the high ranges of the Tian Shan to the north and south. The rivers are meandering and braided over gravel beds. In 1982, the Du-Ku highway was built across the Tian Shan, greatly opening access to the area.

Climate
The area has a cold desert climate (Köppen climate classification BWk). There are extreme seasonal variation in temperature, and nights are cold, even in the summer. The Tian Shan are high enough to collect precipitation from the moist arctic air coming from the northwest. The middle elevations, such as at Bayanbulak, receive an average of 270 mm of precipitation per year, enough to support steppe floral communities.

Ecoregion
The Bayan Bulak Reserve is in the Tian Shan montane steppe and meadows ecoregion (WWF #1019).  This region centers on the isolated Tian Sham mountains of Central Asia, and is characterized by extreme altitude differences - from glaciers at the 7,400 meter levels of the peaks to the flat deserts and steppes at 2,000 meters.

Flora and Fauna
The vegetation is sub-alpine and alpine meadow and steppe for the most part.  The lowest sections of the basin are swamp and swamp-meadow.   The greater grasslands of the Bayanbulak are one of the most productive pasturelands in China, with an estimated 1.5 million sheep causing over-grazing in areas around the reserve.

In recent years, there has been aggressive growth of Pedicularis kansuensis, a type of Lousewort, that has damaged the local vegetation.

The area is best known for its breeding swans.  The swan population was estimated at over 20,000 in the 1980s, but by 2001 this had declined to 2,000.  Over 120 species of birds have been recorded at the site.   The swamp areas, most valuable to the waterfowl, have characteristic vegetation of Carex (sedges), Triglochin palustris (marsh arrowgrass), Batrachium, and Utricularia (bladderwort).

Access and Tourism
An admission fee is charged for tourists.  Hotels and guest houses are available in Bayanbulak, and tents may be rented on the grassland.  There is a cultural event for locals and tourists each year, the Nadam Fair, featuring horse racing, wrestling, and other local customs.

See also
 List of protected areas of China

Mongolia
 Bayanbulag, a sum (district) in Bayankhongor Aimags (province)

Russia
 , a ulus in Aginsky District, Agin-Buryat Okrug, Zabaykalsky Krai

References

External links
Map of Reserve Boundaries, ProtectedPlanet.net
Factsheet for Bayanbulak Grassland, Birdlife International

Nature reserves in China
Grasslands of China
Parks in Xinjiang
Bayingolin Mongol Autonomous Prefecture
Tian Shan